Jo Ractliffe (born 9 March 1961) is a South African photographer and teacher working in both Cape Town, where she was born, and Johannesburg, South Africa. She is considered among the most influential South African "social photographers."

Career 
She pursued her education in Cape Town, including her Diploma in Fine Art at Ruth Prowse School of Art, Woodstock, and her Bachelor of Fine Arts (1985) and her Master of Fine Arts (1988) at the Michaelis School of Fine Art at the University of Cape Town.

Starting from her first show, the Master of Fine Arts Graduate Show at the Irma Stern Museum, Ractliffe's photography has gained international attention with shows in South Africa, at the MET, MOMA, Tate Modern, and the Gwangju Biennial in South Korea. Okwui Enwezor has described Ractliffe as “one of the most accomplished and under-rated photographers of her generation.” Ractliffe's works have been exhibited independently and in conjunction with other notable artists such as David Goldblatt, Guy Tillim, William Kentridge, Pieter Hugo, and Zanele Muholi.

She has received numerous awards. Her photobook As Terras do Fim do Mundo was awarded "Best Photobook of 2010" at the International Photobook Festival in Kassel and she was nominated for the Discovery Prize at the Rencontres d'Arles Photography Festival in 2011.

She has held the Writing Fellowship at the Wits Institute for Social and Economic Research in 2010; the Ampersand Foundation fellowship in New York in 2008; the Christian Merian Stiftung fellowship at iaab studios, Basel, Switzerland, in 2001; and the Ecole Cantonale d'Art du Vallais fellowship in Sierre, Switzerland in 2001.

She has had public or curatorial projects, including Johannesburg Circa Now, Johannesburg Art Gallery, South Africa in 2004; Joubert Park Project, Johannesburg, South Africa in 2000, and End of Time Pinhole Photography Project, Nieu-Bethesda, Great Karoo, South Africa in 1999; and Truth Veils, Centre for the Study of Violence and Reconciliation; the Wits History Workshop, University of Witwatersrand, Johannesburg, South Africa.

Ractliffe is also a senior lecturer at the Witwatersrand School of Arts at Wits University, Johannesburg. She has also taught at the Salzburg International Summer Academy of Fine Arts in Salzburg, Austria, and at the Market Photo Workshop in Johannesburg.

Art themes 
Ractliffe's photography spans many subjects, but focuses on exploring a specific subject (such as her collection of unpublished images spanning about 25 years: Everything is Everything) or complex landscapes (such as her collection The Borderlands). According to the Metropolitan Museum of Art, Ractliffe “has directed her camera toward landscapes to address themes of displacement, conflict, history, memory, and erasure.” Ractliffe has been described as "a documentary photographer who captures the traces of violence, displacement and struggle in a landscape." Her images evoke memory, history, and the aftermath of conflict. Her work engages with the remnants of conflict, visible as scars in the landscape.

Art practice 
Ractliffe uses a wide range of photographic and art practices, including snapshot, documentary, forensic and studio photography, as well as installation video and projections. However, her main medium is the analog black and white image, "which captures a reality bordering on the mysterious, which the artist emphasizes in her printing techniques." In conversation with Kathleen MacQueen for BOMB Magazine, Ractliffe defined her photography practice as “very much about seeing--and being critical and self-reflexive about what such seeing means.”  According to her artist's statement Ractliffe is interested in exploring “things that are ephemeral - desire, loss, longing - and their relationship to photography. I am also curious about what we don't expect from photographs, what they leave out, their silence and the spaces they occupy between 'reality' and 'desire'. I try to work in an area between the things we know and things we don't know; what sits outside the frame. I am interested in exploring these oblique and furtive 'spaces of betweenness', and in how they figure in producing meaning in a mode of representation that seems so often predicated on specificity and transparency. ”

Works 
Her 2009/2010 book of photography As Terras do Fim do Mundo (Portuguese for "The Lands of the End of the World"), also known as "The Aftermath of Conflict" or "The Ghosts of Angola's Civil War," is a collection of black and white film photographs that capture the lingering end of Angola's Civil War. It includes fifty-five photographs, sometimes sixty when printed with earlier works such as Terreno Occupado, which traced the routes of the Border War fought by South Africa in Angola through the 1970s and 80s. Following Terreno Ocupado, which focused on Luanda five years after the country's civil war ended, As Terras do Fim do Mundo "shifts attention away from the urban manifestation of aftermath to the space of war itself. Ractliffe's black and white photographs explore the idea of landscape as pathology, how past violence manifests in the landscape of the present."

According to a review by the Collector Daily, "Ractliffe’s photographs have a silent emptiness to them, where the rocky desert and scrub forest stand mute in the face of history. Her pictures document mass graves, minefields, abandoned crops, ambush sites, improvised memorials, trench systems, and dusty battlefields, singling out some small marker or piece of evidence in the otherwise indifferent landscape. Her platinum prints further soften the harshness of the environment, their tonalities more gentle and forgiving; stands of swaying long grass hide a minefield, pockmarked murals lurk in quiet buildings, or lines of white stones call out the edges of a missile bunker." The most published photo of the collection depicts seven pairs of black and blue overalls hanging from a tree, which the Metropolitan Museum of Art chose to represent Ractliffe's solo show in 2015. Ractliffe comments on the photo in a personal essay for The Guardian, “They are the hollow men.” In a review by The New York Times, "It’s through this historical lens that Ms. Ractliffe views landscape: as morally neutral terrain rendered uninhabitable by terrible facts from the past — the grave of hundreds of Namibia refugees, most of them children, killed in an air raid; the unknown numbers of landmines buried in Angola’s soil. Some are now decades old but can still detonate, so the killing goes on." In conversation around As Terras do Fim do Mundo, Ractliffe has been quoted to say, “One of the reasons for embarking on this project was, in some way, to attempt to locate the imaginary of [The Angolan War], to engage the myths that circulate and to retrieve a place for memory… I’ve spoken a bit about this collision of past and present in the landscape, but it was also colliding in me.”

Coverage 
Ractliffe's works have been discussed in many publications, from her own photography collections, such as her book As Terras do Fim do Mundo: The Lands of the End of the World , to group collections, such as Okwui Enwezor's book of over 250 photographs by 30 African artists: Snap Judgments: New Positions in Contemporary African Photography.  Her works have been catalogued both as works of art and works of history, as in Okwui Enwezor and Michael Godby's book Rise and Fall of Apartheid: Photography and the Bureaucracy of Everyday Life. This book features "some of the most iconic images of our time" and a "unique combination of photojournalism and commentary [that] offers a probing and comprehensive exploration of the birth, evolution, and demise of apartheid in South Africa. Photographers played an important role in the documentation of apartheid, capturing the system's penetration of even the most mundane aspects of life in South Africa."

In a New Yorker preview and review of Ractliffe's exhibit The Aftermath of Conflict," her body of work is described as having “an odd charge nonetheless, as if the South African photographer had channelled some collective memory. Most of the sites Ractliffe selects are desolate (a field of weeds, a capsized boat, a graveyard), and the resulting pictures can sometimes feel puzzling. But the pain and trauma are palpable, as are Ractliffe’s rigor and restraint: fallow farmlands are riddled with land mines; trash spills down a ravine and into a slum; clothes hang from a dead thorn tree.”  The online journal Don't Take Pictures remarked that Ractliffe's images "demonstrate that Ractliffe understands that the impact of war is to be found not only people and the sometimes desperate places they inhabit, but also in rituals of living that, when divorced from circumstance, assume a kind of stark beauty and haunting memory of what life requires to persist or even thrive. With the photographer’s camera focused tightly on imagery which is often trimmed of context, we are confronted with the unsettling truth that war, in its awful beauty, ravages not just distant lands, but lives closer to home as well."

Her exhibit Vlakplaas (Happenings in Afikaans) is a name alluding to the anti-insurgency government and police agency that acted as an execution site for opponents of apartheid. Vlakplaas was located on a farm near Pretoria. Ractliffe states that the body of work “was commissioned for Truth Veils, an exhibition mounted at the Gertrude Posel Gallery in 1999 to accompany the conference The TRC: Commissioning the Past at the University of the Witwatersrand. It was presented in relation to Prime Evil, a documentary film about Vlakplaas commander Eugene de Kock.” The conference, and Ractliffe's show, were designed in response to South Africa's Truth and Reconciliation Commission and the lasting legacy of apartheid.

Things Fall Apart was a group exhibition that took its title from Chinua Achebe's novel Things Fall Apart. "Seen by many as the archetypal modern African novel in English, the book reflects on the devastating impact of colonialism in Africa. The exhibition uses this association to focus on a similar loss of utopian perspective following the end of the Cold War and collapse of the Communist Bloc’s investment in African cultural and political development. Things Fall Apart presents fifteen contemporary artists’ projects linked to this theme in different ways."

Figures and Fictions was a group show that exhibited the work of seventeen photographers. The hosting museum saidof the exhibit: "The excitement and urgency surrounding photography in South Africa today is partly explained by its local context: embedded in colonial history, ethnography, anthropology, journalism and political activism, the best photography emerging from the country has absorbed and grapples with its weighty history, questioning, manipulating and revivifying its visual codes and blending them with contemporary concerns. Post-Apartheid, complex and fundamental issues - race, society, gender, identity - remain very much on the surface. This is reflected by image makers who harness the resulting scenes as a form of creative tension within their personal vision. Here, distinctive photographic voices have emerged: local in character and subject matter, but of wider international interest because of their combined intensity."

Impressions from South Africa was an exhibit at New York's Museum of Modern Art that showcased South African art from the height of apartheid in 1965 onwards. "From the earliest print in the exhibition, made in 1965 (the Museum’s first acquisition of work by a South African artist), to printed posters from the height of the antiapartheid movement in the 1980s, to projects by a younger generation that reflect new and evolving artistic concerns, these works are striking examples of printed art as a tool for social and artistic expression."

Exhibits

Solo exhibitions

Recent group exhibitions

Collections

References

External links
 

South African photographers
South African women photographers
Living people
Artists from Cape Town
21st-century photographers
1961 births
21st-century women photographers